Kutchi Memons is a Sunni Islamic community located in Mumbai.

History
Kutchi Memons came to Mumbai in 1813 being attracted to the trading aspect of the city.

References

Muslim communities of India